Defending gold medalists Gigi Fernández and Mary Joe Fernández of the United States successfully defended their title, defeating the Czech Republic's Jana Novotná and Helena Suková in the final, 7–6(8–6), 6–4 to win the gold medal in Women's Doubles tennis at the 1996 Summer Olympics. In the bronze-medal match, Spain's Conchita Martínez and Arantxa Sánchez Vicario defeated the Netherlands' Manon Bollegraf and Brenda Schultz-McCarthy, 6–1, 6–3.

The tournament was held at the Stone Mountain Tennis Center in Atlanta, of the United States of America. There were 62 competitors from 31 countries. Countries had been limited to one team each since the return of tennis to the Olympic program in 1988.

Medalists

Seeds 
The top seeded team received a bye into the second round.

Draw

Finals

Top half

Bottom half

References 

 ITF Olympic site

1996
Women's Doubles
1996 in women's tennis
Women's events at the 1996 Summer Olympics